Telecrates melanochrysa is a moth of the family Xyloryctidae. It is known in Australia from the Australian Capital Territory, New South Wales, Tasmania and Victoria.

The wingspan is about 24 mm. The head is black and the face is whitish-ochreous. The thorax is orange-yellow and the abdomen is black. The forewings are sub-oblong and orange-yellow with three broad black transverse fasciae.

References

Telecrates
Moths described in 1939